The 1968–69 1re série season was the 48th season of the 1re série, the top level of ice hockey in France. Sporting Hockey Club Saint Gervais won their first league title.

Final ranking
 1st place: Sporting Hockey Club Saint Gervais
 2nd place: Chamonix Hockey Club
 3rd place: Gap Hockey Club
 4th place: Ours de Villard-de-Lans
 5th place: Athletic Club de Boulogne-Billancourt
 6th place: US Métro
 7th place: Français Volants
 8th place: ?
 9th place: CPM Croix
 10th place: Diables Rouges de Briançon
 11th place: ?
 12th place: Courchevel
 13th place: ?
 14th place: Club des Sports de Megève
 15th place: CSG Paris
 16th place: Club des patineurs lyonnais
 17th place: ?
 18th place: Pralognan-la-Vanoise
 19th place: Les Houches
 20th place: Grenoble UNI
 21st place: ASPP Paris
 22nd place: Pingouins de Morzine
 23rd place: Hockey Club de Reims
 24th place: Embrun

External links
List of French champions on hockeyarchives.info

France
1968–69 in French ice hockey
Ligue Magnus seasons